Chiwembe is a township in southern Malawi.

Chiwembe is mentioned in the song Police Hunt Matafale by the popular Malawian reggae band Black Missionaries. Chiwembe is also where the football association of Malawi has its headquarters. It has well planned housing with the Malawi Housing Cooperation as the landlords of most of the housing.

See also
Chilembwe uprising

Populated places in Southern Region, Malawi

tum:Chimwembe,Blantyre